Nordvest is a Danish action-drama film from 2013, directed by Michael Noer and written by Rasmus Heisterberg. It is Noer's first solo project as a movie director, after he directed the critically acclaimed prison film R (2010) together with Tobias Lindholm.

Nordvest received generally good reviews. It ended up selling 88,849 tickets in Danish cinemas, and has won awards including at the French Festival de Beaune and the Romanian Transilvania International Film Festival. Nordvest got its world premiere at the Rotterdam International Film Festival in January, and was also the opening film at the Copenhagen film festival.

External links 
 

Danish drama films
Films about organized crime in Denmark
Films set in Copenhagen
2013 drama films
2013 films
2010s Danish-language films
Films directed by Michael Noer